The Hero of Every Girl's Dream (German: Der Held aller Mädchenträume) is a 1929 German silent film directed by Robert Land and starring Harry Liedtke, Betty Bird and Hermine Sterler.

The film's sets were designed by Robert Neppach.

Cast
 Harry Liedtke as Vicomte de Lormand  
 Betty Bird as Marianne Turbon 
 Hermine Sterler as Madame Turbon  
 Jeanne Helbling as Lolotte 
 Gertrud Arnold 
 Oreste Bilancia 
 Karl Elzer 
 Charles Puffy 
 Max Maximilian 
 Karl Platen 
 Anton Pointner 
 Rosa Valetti 
 Marcel Vibert as Marquis de Corbé

References

Bibliography
 Prawer, S.S. Between Two Worlds: The Jewish Presence in German and Austrian Film, 1910-1933. Berghahn Books, 2005.
 Ragowski, Christian. The Many Faces of Weimar Cinema: Rediscovering Germany's Filmic Legacy. Camden House, 2010.

External links

1929 films
Films of the Weimar Republic
German silent feature films
Films directed by Robert Land
German black-and-white films